Janez Nepomuk Mikolitsch  was a politician of the 18th century in Slovenia, when the country was under the rule of the Holy Roman Empire. He became mayor of Ljubljana in 1774. He was succeeded by Anton Fran Wagner in 1775.

References

Mayors of places in the Holy Roman Empire
Mayors of Ljubljana
Year of birth missing
Year of death missing
18th-century Carniolan people